Piya Ka Aangan is a drama series based on the story of Shlok and Swati falling in love. Swati was initially married to Shlok's elder brother Sameer, who was killed by the main antagonist Vicky Bajaj. Due to circumstances Shlok had to marry Swati without her consent to save her from Vicky Bajaj. The story deals with how they fall in love with each other and how they face their families. The series premiered on 16 February 2009.

Cast
 Hemangi Kavi (Swati)
 Akshat Gupta as Sameer
 Sunny Gujral (Ranavir) 
 Rajeev Verma(Udai Dabral)
 Amita Nangia (Nandini)
 Yusuf Hussain (Sherawat)
 Vineeta Malik  (Dadi)
 Akashaditya Lama (Vicky Bajaj)
 Ankita Shrivastav (Mantasha)
 Tanima Bhattacharya (Christina)
 Raunaq Ahuja (Shlok)

References

DD National original programming
Indian drama television series
Indian television series